Robert Joseph Sullivan was a walk-on offensive half back and defensive back out of Holy Cross who played for the dominant 1948 San Francisco 49ers under head coach Buck Shaw. The team went 12-2, finishing 2nd in the AAFC West.

His only touchdown came as a return TD.

Defensively, Sullivan had one interception for a six-yard return.

College years

References

American football defensive backs
American football halfbacks
Great Lakes Navy Bluejackets football players
Holy Cross Crusaders football players
San Francisco 49ers players